Al-Juzjani is a toponymic surname or nisba for people from Juzjan (or Guzgan). Notable people with the surname include:

 Abu 'Ubayd al-Juzjani (980–1037), physician and pupil of Ibn Sina
 Ibrahim ibn Ya'qub al-Juzajani (790–872), Islamic hadith scholar
 Minhaj-i Siraj Juzjani (born 1193), thirteenth-century chronicler of India under the Delhi Sultanate, writer of Tabaqat-i Nasiri

Nisbas
Toponymic surnames
People from Jowzjan Province